Nyatoh is a trade name for wood of a number of hardwood species of the genera Palaquium and Payena growing in rainforest environments in southeast Asia, especially in Indonesia and the Philippines. Nyatoh wood is reddish and most species are easy to work with and takes to stain and polish well. It has a tight straight grain that resembles cherry wood. The surface is dark brown/red in color.

Sustainability 
Nyatoh is generally perceived as a sustainable resource. However, several species within the related genera of Palaquium and Payena are on the IUCN Red List due to overexploitation and alarming reductions in their habitats.

The harvesting and sales of nyatoh has been criticized by some environmental groups, who have won agreements in the United States to not resell the wood from various furniture and home-improvement chains.

References

Sapotoideae
Wood
Plant common names